Fiji One is a free-to-air television channel run by Fiji Television. It provides coverage throughout Fiji. It is fully funded from revenue generated through commercial advertisements, meaning that programs have commercial breaks.

References

Fiji One